Bertran de Paris de Roergue (fl. post 1260) was a troubadour who composed the enseignamen "Gordo, ie.us fatz un sol sirventes l'an". The Hungarian scholar István Frank hypothesised that Bertran hailed from Parisot and re-classified his work as a sirventes. He has been identified with Bertran IV de Paris.

References
Bibliografia Elettronica dei Trovatori, v. 2.0. Retrieved 4 October 2011.

13th-century French troubadours
People from Tarn-et-Garonne
Year of birth unknown
Year of death unknown